Connor Charles Hellebuyck (born May 19, 1993) is an American professional ice hockey goaltender for the Winnipeg Jets of the National Hockey League (NHL). He was selected by the Jets in the fifth round, 130th overall, of the 2012 NHL Entry Draft.

Playing career

Amateur
After completing his high school career at Walled Lake Northern High School in Commerce Township, Michigan, Hellebuyck played one year of junior hockey as a member of the Odessa Jackalopes, a franchise that had been a minor league affiliate of the New York Islanders but had recently moved to junior hockey as part of the North American Hockey League (NAHL). Hellebuyck went from being virtually unknown to a top prospect while playing in Odessa, and was drafted by the Winnipeg Jets following his season in Odessa.

Hellebuyck earned a scholarship to play for the UMass Lowell River Hawks in the NCAA Men's Division I Hockey East Conference, where in two seasons he played 54 games and compiled a 38–12–2 record with a .946 save percentage, 1.60 goals against average and 12 shutouts. He won the Hockey East Championship and made a Frozen Four appearance in his freshman year. Lowell would repeat as Hockey East Champions the following year and Hellebuyck became the only player in Hockey East history to be named tournament MVP twice. Following his second year, Hellebuyck's outstanding play was rewarded with a selection to the 2013–14 Hockey East First Team.

For the 2013–14 season, Hellebuyck was awarded the inaugural Mike Richter Award as the top goaltender in college hockey. Hellebuyck departed UMass Lowell as the school's shutout leader with 12 shutouts in 54 games, surpassing former National Hockey League and former UMass Lowell goaltender Carter Hutton. He also owns single-season records for best save percentage (.952) and GAA (1.37), both in 2012–13.

Professional
Hellebuyck chose to forgo his final two years of college eligibility when he signed a three-year, entry-level contract with the Winnipeg Jets of the National Hockey League (NHL) on April 5, 2014. In the 2014–15 season, he played his first full professional season with the Jets' American Hockey League (AHL) affiliate, the St. John's IceCaps and was selected to the 2015 AHL All-Star Game serving as the Eastern Conference starter. Hellebuyck was called up by the Jets late in the regular season to dress as the backup goaltender for one game. On November 22, 2015, the Jets called up Hellebuyck after Ondřej Pavelec was injured during a game against the Arizona Coyotes. On November 27, 2015, Hellebuyck won his first NHL game, against the Minnesota Wild. On December 27, Hellebuyck recorded his first NHL shutout in a 1–0 win over the Pittsburgh Penguins.

Hellebuyck made the 2016–17 Jets ahead of Ondřej Pavelec. During his first season as a starter, Hellebuyck posted a 26–19–4 record in 56 games.

On July 24, 2017, the Jets re-signed Hellebuyck to a one-year contract worth $2.25 million.

In the 2017–18 season, Hellebuyck posted a 44–11–9 record in 67 games, setting the record for the most single-season wins by an American goaltender in the NHL, previously held by Tom Barrasso of the 1992 title-winning Pittsburgh Penguins, as well as the record for most single-season home ice wins by an NHL goaltender, previously tied at 29 by Miikka Kiprusoff and Evgeni Nabokov. On April 17, 2018, Hellebuyck was named a Vezina Trophy finalist as the league's top goaltender. He was the runner-up to Nashville Predators goaltender Pekka Rinne.

On July 12, 2018, Hellebuyck signed a six-year, $37 million (worth an average annual value of $6.167 million) contract extension with the Jets.

In the 2019–20 season, Hellebuyck was second in the NHL in wins (31), first in shutouts (six), and seventh in save percentage (.922) among goalies who played at least 20 games. He was 31–21–5 with a 2.57 goals-against average and allowed two or fewer goals in 32 of his 58 games to help the Jets (37–28–6, .563 points percentage) advance to the Stanley Cup Qualifiers. On July 17, 2020, Hellebuyck was named a Vezina Trophy finalist as the league's top goaltender along with Boston Bruins goaltender Tuukka Rask and Tampa Bay Lightning goaltender Andrei Vasilevskiy. On September 21, 2020, before Game 2 of the Stanley Cup Finals, Hellebuyck was named the winner of the Vezina Trophy for the 2019–20 season, becoming the first goalie in Winnipeg Jets/Atlanta Thrashers history to win the award.

On February 4, 2021, Hellebuyck won his 153rd NHL game as the Jets beat the Calgary Flames 4–1, breaking the Jets/Thrashers franchise record for wins by a goaltender, previously held by Ondřej Pavelec.

On April 24, 2022, Hellebuyck played in his 380th game as a Winnipeg Jet and he earned his 200th career victory (also as a Winnipeg Jet) as the Jets beat the Colorado Avalanche 4–1.

International play

Hellebuyck was chosen by the United States to play at the 2015 Men's World Ice Hockey Championships. Hellebuyck would backstop Team USA to a Bronze Medal in the tourney. Hellebuyck posted a record of 7–1–0 with a pair of shutouts during his eight tournament games. He would also finish with a 1.37 goals-against average and a .948 saving percentage. His seven wins tied a U.S. record for most in a single tournament set in 1939. Hellebuyck had been named to the initial roster of Team North America for the 2016 World Cup of Hockey.

Career statistics

Regular season and playoffs

International

Awards and honours

References

External links

1993 births
Living people
American men's ice hockey goaltenders
Ice hockey players from Michigan
Manitoba Moose players
Odessa Jackalopes players
People from Commerce, Michigan
St. John's IceCaps players
UMass Lowell River Hawks men's ice hockey players
Winnipeg Jets draft picks
Winnipeg Jets players
National Hockey League All-Stars
Vezina Trophy winners
AHCA Division I men's ice hockey All-Americans